"Queen of Rain" is a pop ballad by Swedish duo Roxette. It was released on 28 October 1992 as the second single from their fourth studio album, Tourism (1992). The song became a top twenty hit in Belgium, the Netherlands, Spain and Sweden, and spent over three months on the German Singles Chart, where it peaked at number nineteen.

Background and recording
The song was recorded in July 1990 at EMI Studios in Stockholm during sessions for their 1991 album Joyride. It was originally set to appear as that album's final track, but was excluded in favour of "Perfect Day". However, the closing notes and sound effects contained on the outro of the album version of "Things Will Never Be the Same" – the track which precedes "Perfect Day" on Joyride – can still be heard over the crowd noise contained on the intro of "Queen of Rain". Roxette later recorded a Spanish version of the track, titled "Una reina va detrás de un rey" ("A Queen Goes After a King"), for their 1996 compilation album Baladas en Español.

Prior to the release of "Queen of Rain", one of the single's b-side, "Pearls of Passion", had remained unreleased outside of Sweden. The song would later be included as a bonus track on the 1997 reissue of their debut album, Pearls of Passion (1986).

Critical reception
AllMusic editor Bryan Buss described the song as "haunting" and "hopeful" in his review of Tourism.

Formats and track listings

 Cassette and 7" single (Europe 8650124 · UK EM253)
 "Queen of Rain" – 4:49
 "It Must Have Been Love" (Live from the Sydney Entertainment Centre on 13 December 1991) – 5:29

 CD single (Europe · Australia 8650132)
 "Queen of Rain" – 4:49
 "It Must Have Been Love" (Live from Sydney) – 5:29
 "Paint" (Live from Sydney) – 3:20
 "Pearls of Passion" – 3:33

 UK CD1 single (UK CDEMS253)
 "Queen of Rain" (Radio Edit) – 4:28
 "Pearls of Passion" – 3:33
 "Interview with Roxette" – 14:30

 UK CD2 single (UK CDEM253)
 "Queen of Rain" – 4:49
 "It Must Have Been Love" (Live from Sydney) – 5:29
 "Paint" (Live from Sydney) – 3:20
 "Dangerous" – 3:46

Personnel
Credits adapted from the liner notes of The Ballad Hits.

 Recorded at EMI Studios in Stockholm, Sweden in June 1990.
 Mixed by Alar Suurna, Per Gessle and Clarence Öfwerman at EMI Studios in Stockholm.

Musicians
 Marie Fredriksson – lead and background vocals
 Per Gessle – background vocals
 Bo Eriksson – oboe
 Anders Herrlin  bass guitar, programming and engineering
 Jonas Isaacson – guitars
 Clarence Öfwerman – keyboards, programming and production
 Alar Suurna – engineering

Charts

References

1992 singles
Roxette songs
Songs written by Per Gessle
Songs written by Mats Persson (musician)
1991 songs
EMI Records singles
Pop ballads
English-language Swedish songs